is a Japanese footballer currently playing as a midfielder for FC Ryukyu.

Career statistics

Club
.

Notes

References

1999 births
Living people
Association football people from Ibaraki Prefecture
Japanese footballers
Association football midfielders
J2 League players
Kashima Antlers players
FC Ryukyu players